Skjoldastraumen Church is a parish church of the Church of Norway in Tysvær Municipality in Rogaland county, Norway. It is located in the village of Skjoldastraumen. It is one of the two churches for the Nedstrand parish which is part of the Haugaland prosti (deanery) in the Diocese of Stavanger. The white, wooden church was built in a long church style in 1910 using designs by the architect Einar Halleland from Haugesund. The church seats about 295 people.

See also
List of churches in Rogaland

References

Tysvær
Churches in Rogaland
Wooden churches in Norway
20th-century Church of Norway church buildings
Churches completed in 1910
1910 establishments in Norway